This is a list of earthquakes in 2011. Only earthquakes of magnitude 6 or above are included, unless they result in damage and/or casualties, or are notable for some other reason.  All dates are listed according to UTC time. The 9.1 Tōhoku earthquake was the fourth most powerful ever recorded and triggered a massive tsunami (around 20,000 deaths). In a very busy year, many earthquakes caused damage in Turkey, New Zealand, Myanmar, India and United States.

Compared to other years

Overall

By death toll

 Note: At least 10 dead

By magnitude

 Note: At least 7.0 magnitude
 Note: Aftershocks of the 2011 Tōhoku earthquake and tsunami are included as they are still over magnitude 7.

By month

January

February

Note: The 2010 Maule Earthquake's aftershocks have not been included due to cluttering.

March

Note: Aftershocks of the Japan earthquake have not been included unless they are above magnitude 7 or lead to casualties.

April

May

June

July

August

  A magnitude 6.1 earthquake struck near the Kuril Islands on August 4.
  A magnitude 6.0 earthquake struck Ascension Island on August 10.
  A magnitude 6.1 earthquake struck the Ceram Sea on August 16.
  A magnitude 6.1 earthquake struck near the east coast of Honshu, Japan, on August 17.
  A magnitude 6.2 earthquake struck the Fiji region on August 19.
  A magnitude 6.2 earthquake struck near the east coast of Honshu, Japan, on August 19.
  A magnitude 7.1 earthquake struck Port Vila, Vanuatu; this was followed by a magnitude 6.5 earthquake less than twenty minutes later, which was followed 1 hour 6 minutes later by a magnitude 7.0 earthquake on August 20.
  A magnitude 6.1 earthquake struck southwest of Sumatra, Indonesia, on August 22.
 / A magnitude 6.8 earthquake struck northern Peru near the Brazilian border on August 24. Local newspapers reported that the earthquake was felt in Lima and in Rio Branco.
  A magnitude 5.8 earthquake struck Virginia on August 23; it caused minor widespread damage and was felt by more people than any other quake in U.S. history, including Washington D.C. and New York City.
  A magnitude 6.2 earthquake struck southwest of Port Vila, Vanuatu, on August 24.
  A magnitude 6.8 earthquake struck at Banda sea, Indonesia, on August 30.

September

  A magnitude 6.0 earthquake struck the Santa Cruz Islands, Solomon Islands, on September 1.
  A magnitude 6.8 earthquake struck near the Fox Islands, Aleutian Islands, Alaska, on September 2.
  A magnitude 6.7 earthquake struck near the Santiago Del Estero Province, Argentina, on September 2.
  A magnitude 6.4 earthquake struck near the Visokoi Island, South Sandwich Islands, on September 3.
  A magnitude 7.0 earthquake struck near Isangel, Vanuatu, on September 3.
  A magnitude 6.2 earthquake struck near Apia, Samoa, on September 5.
  A magnitude 6.6 earthquake struck south-west of Medan, Sumatra, Indonesia on September 5, killing ten people.
  A magnitude 6.4 earthquake struck near Campbell River, British Columbia, Canada, on September 9.
  A magnitude 6.0 earthquake struck near Port Vila, Vanuatu, on September 11.
  A magnitude 6.2 earthquake struck near Wewak, Papua New Guinea, on September 12.
  A magnitude 6.1 earthquake struck near the Aleutian Islands, Alaska, United States, on September 14.
  A magnitude 6.0 earthquake struck east of the North Island, New Zealand, on September 15.
  A magnitude 6.2 earthquake struck near the east coast of Honshu, Japan, on September 15.
  A magnitude 7.3 earthquake struck the Fiji region on September 15.
  A magnitude 6.6 earthquake struck near the east coast of Honshu, Japan, on September 16.
  A magnitude 6.0 earthquake struck off the east coast of Honshu, Japan, on September 16.
  A magnitude 6.9 earthquake struck Sikkim, India, near the Nepalese border on September 18, killing at least 111 people.
  A magnitude 5.8 earthquake struck southeast of Guatemala City on September 19, triggering landslides and killing at least 3 people.
  A magnitude 6.5 earthquake struck Tonga on September 22.

October

 A magnitude 2.4 earthquake struck Central Honshu, Japan on October 7. One person was killed by falling rocks while mountain climbing.
 A magnitude 6.1 earthquake struck near Raoul Island, Kermadec Islands on October 7.
 A magnitude 6.1 earthquake struck 130 kilometres south-southwest of Denpasar, Bali, Indonesia on October 13.
 A magnitude 6.5 earthquake struck Eastern Papua New Guinea on October 14.
 A magnitude 6.1 earthquake struck Amurskaya Oblast', Russia on October 14.
 A magnitude 6.0 earthquake struck the New Britain region, Papua New Guinea on October 18.
 A magnitude 6.1 earthquake Hokkaido, Japan on October 21.
 A magnitude 7.4 earthquake struck near Raoul Island, Kermadec Islands on October 21.
 A magnitude 7.1 earthquake struck near Van, Turkey on October 23. This was later followed by a magnitude 6.0 aftershock.
 A magnitude 6.0 earthquake south-east of Vanua Levu, Fiji on October 27.
 A magnitude 6.9 earthquake struck near the coast of central Peru on October 28, killing one person.
 A magnitude 3.5 earthquake struck Sikkim, India on October 29, killing 2 people.

November

  A magnitude 6.3 earthquake struck the Revillagigedo Islands region, Mexico on November 1.
 A magnitude 6.2 earthquake struck the Pacific–Antarctic Ridge, South Pacific Ocean on November 2.
  A magnitude 5.7 earthquake struck near Prague, Oklahoma on November 6.
  A magnitude 6.9 earthquake struck near Kumejima, Okinawa, Japan on November 8.
 A magnitude 5.6 earthquake struck near Van, Turkey on November 9, killing 40 people.
 A magnitude 6.3 earthquake struck the Molucca Sea, Indonesia on November 14.
 A magnitude 6.0 earthquake struck near Gisborne, New Zealand on November 18.
  A magnitude 6.6 earthquake struck the Beni region, Bolivia on November 22.
  A magnitude 6.1 earthquake struck near Honshu, Japan on November 23.
  A magnitude 6.2 earthquake struck Hokkaido, Japan on November 24.
  A magnitude 6.4 earthquake struck the New Ireland region, Papua New Guinea on November 28.
  A magnitude 6.0 earthquake struck near Luzon, Philippines on November 30.

December

  A magnitude 6.1 earthquake struck Atacama, Chile on December 7.
  A magnitude 6.5 earthquake struck Guerrero, Mexico on December 10, killing 3 people.
  A magnitude 6.2 earthquake struck the South Sandwich Islands region on December 11.
  A magnitude 6.0 earthquake struck near Gorontalo, North Sulawesi, Indonesia on December 13.
  A magnitude 7.1 earthquake struck near Lae, eastern New Guinea, Papua New Guinea on December 14.
 A magnitude 6.3 earthquake struck south of the Kermadec Islands, New Zealand on December 15.
 A magnitude 6.0 earthquake struck near Hihifo, Tonga on December 26.
 A magnitude 6.6 earthquake struck near Kyzyl, Russia on December 27.

References

2011
2011